Dana is a small uninhabited island in Indonesia. It is also known by the names Pulau Dana, Ndana, Nieuw Eiland and Hokki.

Island of Spirits
The island lies to southwest of Sawu Island in the Sabu Raijua Regency and 30 kilometers from Raijua island. The island is not visited throughout the year except on one annual pilgrimage by the Raijua elders and people per year. It is believed in the ancestral culture that it is inhabited by the spirits of their ancestors and that they should be respected and left in peace. The island is barred to all westerners and outsiders unless consulting with the elders first.

Geography, Flora and Fauna
The southern side is steep with cliffs and the water carries a heavy current and swells. The island is inhabited by goats, and sheep. This island is mostly a dead island, with very few human visitors.

References

Lesser Sunda Islands
Landforms of East Nusa Tenggara
Uninhabited islands of Indonesia